Rugby union match officials are responsible for enforcing the rugby union laws of the game during a match and imposing sanctions on individuals who do not follow the rules. "Every match is under the control of match officials who consist of the referee and two touch judges or assistant referees." Further officials can be authorised depending on the level and form of the game.

History 

When the game of rugby union was developed at Rugby school, there were no official rugby referees. It was not until many years later when the game began to spread internationally that an official was included.

Before the creation of rugby referees, the captains from both teams would set the rules down before the game began. The two captains would arbitrate the game together as it went on. This is where the ‘advantage’ law comes from in rugby union. This was because a team’s captain was not likely to complain or stop play if his side benefited from the other team’s infringement.

In 1892, the International Rugby Board was created as a result of a disputed try that the captains could not agree on whether it had been scored. The rugby laws were changed to require one referee and two touch judges at each game to make the arbitration easier and more consistent.

Since then the match official’s job has remained constant. The main change has been in the uniform and since 2000 the use of communication equipment and the television match official has greatly increased.

Equipment

Compulsory equipment

Rugby union match officials must use the following equipment:
Coin
The referee organises a coin toss with the team captains to decide who kicks off and what end each team takes initially.
Whistle
Referees must carry a whistle to indicate certain occurrences in the game.
Red card
A red card is used to signal that a player is being sent from the field, or "sent off", for the rest of a match. The referee signals this by holding it aloft in the direction of the player. In International matches, a red card must be used to send a player off unlike rugby league where a player can simply be pointed to the touchline by the referee. (Red cards are not required at lower level matches but most referees carry them.)
Yellow card 
A yellow card is used to signal that a player is being temporarily suspended from the game. The player is sent to the "sin bin" for 10 minutes, after which time they are allowed to return to carry on playing. Similarly to the red card, in International matches a yellow card must be used to temporarily suspend a player unlike Rugby league where the referee, while facing the player being disciplined, will hold out both hands with fingers and thumbs spread to represent 10 minutes.
Flag
The touch judges or assistant referees must each carry a flag, which is used to signal certain things to the referee, players and spectators. The things that a touch judge can indicate with the flag are slightly different from that of an assistant referee. A touch judge must indicate a successful kick at goal (unlike rugby league the flag is simply kept down for an unsuccessful kick), when the ball or player holding the ball has gone out of bounds and which team is to throw in. They must also leave the flag up if the wrong team has thrown the ball in, the wrong ball is used at a quick throw, the ball has been touched by any other person than the player throwing the ball at a quick throw and if the foot or part of the foot of the player throwing in is in the field of play.
Watch
The referee is required to have a watch or timekeeping device as the referee is solely responsible for keeping the time. In some situations such as professional games time keepers may be appointed and signal the ends of halves but referees are still required to keep the time themselves.
Score card
Referees are required to carry a scorecard as they are solely responsible for keeping the score. Once again this job is often given to others but the referee is responsible for the score and must keep it in case there is a complaint about the correctness of the score.

Other common equipment
Rugby union match officials may use the following equipment:
Uniform
Many rugby unions require referees to wear a specific uniform to make them easily identifiable and to support the relevant sponsor. These uniforms are usually picked so that they stand out from the teams playing so the ball is not passed to a referee. Uniforms usually consist of a jersey, shorts and socks. In high level games, other officials will also be required to wear a uniform.
Boots
Many rugby unions also require their referees to wear rugby boots so they can move quickly and easily around the field. Some unions do permit the use of running shoes as an alternative.
Microphone and earpiece
Communication equipment can be used to communicate between officials. This is also often used in televised games to allow viewers to hear what is happening.

Positions and responsibilities

Referee

Pre-match
Before the game, a referee must:
Check the field to ensure it is safe to play on and meets all regulations. This includes checking the flags, posts, lines and pads.
Check the player's clothing and studs on their boots to ensure they comply with the regulations. A referee may delegate this responsibility to an assistant referee. In some unions, this includes checking mouth guards. The introduction of the law which made mouth guards compulsory for rugby union players has led to a 43 percent drop in dental injuries in New Zealand club rugby.
Have a discussion with the front row players of both teams to ensure they are aware of how to perform the scrum safely and to outline the referee’s calls in this area. Since the inception of this requirement coupled with the Rugby Smart program there has been a dramatic decline in spinal related injuries caused by rugby. In New Zealand alone (the first to try this scheme) there has been a reduction from around four serious spinal injuries to 0.7 per 100 000 in 2005.
Organise a toss with the two captains. A coin must be used. The team who wins the toss can choose to kick or choose a direction to play for the first half.  If they choose a direction, the other team kicks off.
Inform touch judges or assistant referees what their duties are.

During the match

The duties of the referee during the game are:
To be the sole judge of fact and law. The referee must apply fairly all the laws of the game in every match.
To keep the time.
To keep the score.
Give permission for players to leave the playing area.
Give permission for replacements or substitutes to enter the playing area.
Give permission for doctors, persons or their assistants to enter the playing area, as and when permitted by the law.
Give permission for coaches to enter the field at half time.
Respond to touch judges or assistant referees signalling with the flag.
Ensure safety of players by monitoring blood and injuries as well as ensuring mouth guards are worn and clothing maintains compliant with the regulations.

After the match
After the game a referee is required to:
Communicate score to both teams and to the match organiser. This often includes signing a form with the score on it that is sent to the rugby union in charge of that fixture
If a player has been sent off or temporarily suspended the referee must give a report to the union in charge of the fixture. (Temporary suspension is commonly not reportable at lower level games.)

Referee's signals

The referee having made a decision is required to indicate the decision by blowing the whistle and signalling. 
Primary signals relate to what decision is being awarded. For example, whether a scrum or penalty is awarded. 
Secondary signals relate to why the decision is being awarded. For example, a knock-on (scrum) or a high tackle (penalty).
There are also signals for stoppages in time, replacement and scoring to ensure everyone knows what is happening.

Touch judge and assistant referee
Assistant referees are appointed by the union in charge of the fixture. They are either themselves qualified referees or qualified assistant referees. Assistant referees may be asked to help with duties that touch judges cannot. Touch judges are normally supplied by the teams playing, one from each team.

Pre-match
Before the match an assistant referee may be asked to check the studs and clothing of the players. A touch judge is not permitted to do this.

During the match
During the game touch judges and assistant referees must:
Stand one on each side of the field except for kicks at goal.
Indicate when the ball or player carrying the ball is out and what team can throw it in.
Indicate if the ball has re-entered the playing field illegally.
Indicate if a kick at goal has been successful. Unsuccessful kicks at goal should not be signalled as they are in Rugby league by waving the flag low towards the ground.

Additional responsibilities of assistant referees:
Must report foul play to the referee and give an opinion on the sanction for the incident.
Rule on the scoring of a try if asked.
Give referee information on any other aspect of the game if asked and using communication gear.
May be asked to keep score and time. Although responsibility is still with the referee to do this.
May be asked to control substitutions.
The senior Assistant Referee can also be required to take over a game if the referee is injured and requires replacing.

After the match
A touch judge has no responsibilities after a match. The only responsibility an assistant referee has is to complete a written report to send to the referee that is then sent to the union in charge of the game. The report is only required if a player has been sent off or temporarily suspended because of their report on foul play.

Touch judge and assistant referees signals

The touch judges and assistant referees cannot stop play, but can signal the referee to enable them to assist him.

Television match official (TMO)
Often referred to as the TMO, a television match official may be appointed to assist the referee in determining whether points have been scored or foul play has been committed. A television match official can only rule on exactly what the referee asks them however can direct the referees attention to foul play by speaking to him through his earpiece. Television match officials are commonly used in first class and international televised games.

In lower level games, where no TMO has been appointed, the referee cannot use video equipment in supporting any decision.  (Local or junior matches are often recorded by coaches or parents, but these videos cannot be used by the referee in supporting a decision due to the possibility of bias.  Such videos may though be acceptable as evidence in any post-match discipline hearing.)

Substitution controller
At higher levels of rugby, some games have appointed substitution controllers (sometimes called the “fourth official” and “fifth official”). These officials liaise with the teams and ensure they only use their permitted number of substitutions. They also indicate to the referee when a substitute is ready to come on. They often use signs with the number of the player coming off and the player going on the field. This means it is one less thing for the referee to worry about. If an assistant referee is injured then one of the substitution controllers will take the place of the assistant referee.

Timekeeper
A timekeeper may also be appointed to indicate to the referee when they believe a half should end. Ultimately, it is up to the referee to decide.

In-goal judge
In-goal judges are used in the seven-a-side variation of rugby union to assist the referee in awarding a try and signalling kicks at goal instead of the assistant referees. In-goal judges are not required in a game where a TMO is present.

Referee assaults

Assaults on rugby referees are being reported more and more in the media. One study found that around 6% of United Kingdom referees surveyed had been physically assaulted. A further examination of the study found that rugby union referees' fear of being assaulted was a significant factor for increased stress. The same study found that rugby referees were most concerned about being assaulted by a spectator or coach. A study by Rainey and Hardy found that it was in fact players who committed assaults on referees the most, contributing to 79% of all assaults on referees.

As a reaction to this rugby unions have begun handing out long bans and large fines to individuals who physically assault a referee, and more recently verbal assault of referees has also received severe punishments. Now the common punishment for a player punching a referee or anything similar is a lifetime ban. The laws of the game have also been changed to help this by making it compulsory for any official to report any abuse on them or another official to the union in charge of the fixture.

Appointments
Appointments of officials to games are usually done by the Union in charge of the fixture. The appointment of referees to international games comes from the IRB International Referees Panel. This ensures that the best officials are adjudicating international matches. Other major competitions such as Super Rugby, Heineken Cup and age group world cups use a similar system.

See also

Rugby league match officials
Touch match officials

References 
References to the Laws or a Law are to the Laws of the game: Rugby Union 2010, published by the International Rugby Board,  Dublin, Ireland.

External links 
World Rugby
World Rugby Laws of the Game
Submissions on changing the rules and responses
World Rugby Officiating
Rugby Union Match Officials Training programmes
Coaches of Rugby Union Match officials programmes
Rugby Union Match Officials forum and information
New Zealand Rugby Union Match Officials site
Australian Rugby Union Match Officials site
South Africa Rugby Union Match Officials site
English Rugby Union Match Officials site
Scottish Rugby Union Match Officials site
Welsh Rugby Union Match Officials site
Irish Rugby Union Match Officials site
Samoan Rugby Union Match Officials site
USA Rugby Union Match Officials site
Swedish Rugby Union Match Officials site
Italian Rugby Union Match Officials site

 
Sports officiating